Leonid Mykhailovych Zhunko (born 9 June 1951, in Krasne Pole, Markivka Raion, Ukraine), is a Ukrainian politician. 

In 2000s he served as a Presidential representative in Crimea as well as Governor of Sevastopol.

References

External links
 Leonid Zhunko at the Liga.Dossier 
 Leonid Zhunko

1951 births
Living people
People from Luhansk Oblast
Presidential representatives of Ukraine in Crimea
Governors of Sevastopol (Ukraine)